is a Japanese manga series written and illustrated by Shuichi Shigeno. It has been serialized in Kodansha's Weekly Young Magazine since September 2017, with its chapters collected into sixteen tankōbon volumes as of February 2023. An anime television series adaptation by Felix Film is set to premiere in 2023.

As of January 2023, the manga had over 4 million copies in circulation.

Plot
The series takes place in the 2020s, where self-driving electric cars have replaced internal combustion ones. However, in Japan, there is a large organization called MFG, founded by Ryosuke Takahashi (from the Initial D series), who does street racing with internal combustion cars. A new rookie,  who is competing with the pseudonym , a 19-year-old Japanese-British young man, has showed up on the scene driving a Toyota 86, and beating European top-tier cars, such as the Lamborghini Huracán Performante, Ferrari 488 GTB, Lotus Exige, Alfa Romeo 4C, Lexus LC500 and Porsche 911 Carrera (991). Kanata has been trained by legendary downhill and rally racer Takumi Fujiwara (protagonist from the Initial D series) at the Royal Donington Racing School in the UK and is a Formula 4 world champion. He has only one motive: to find his long-lost father.

Media

Manga
MF Ghost is written and illustrated by Shuichi Shigeno. The manga began in Kodansha's seinen manga magazine Weekly Young Magazine on September 4, 2017. The series is connected to Shigeno's previous work Initial D. In October 2018, Shigeno stated that the manga is 1/5 finished. In November 2022, it was announced that the manga would enter on indefinite hiatus due to the author's poor health; it is set to resume on February 20, 2023. Kodansha has compiled its chapters into individual tankōbon volumes. The first volume was published on January 5, 2018. As of February 6, 2023, fifteen volumes have been released.

Kodansha USA and Comixology announced that they would publish the manga digitally starting on January 11, 2022.

Volume list

Anime
An anime television series adaptation was announced on January 4, 2022. It is produced by Felix Film and directed by Tomohito Naka, with Kenichi Yamashita supervising the scripts co-written by Akihiko Inari, Naoyuki Onda designing the characters, and Akio Dobashi composing the music. The series is set to premiere in 2023. Medialink has licensed the series in South and Southeast Asia.

Reception
As of January 2019, the manga had over 1 million copies in circulation; by January 2022, it had over 3.2 million copies in circulation; and over 4 million copies in circulation by January 2023.

References

External links
 
 

2023 anime television series debuts
Anime series based on manga
Felix Film
Fiction set in the 2020s
Initial D
Kodansha manga
Motorsports in anime and manga
Seinen manga
Upcoming anime television series